Nicolas Vereecken (born 21 February 1990) is a Belgian former professional cyclist, who rode professionally between 2013 and 2017 for the ,  and  teams.

Major results

2008
 1st Sint-Martinusprijs Kontich
 10th Paris–Roubaix Juniors
2010
 10th Dwars door de Antwerpse Kempen
2012
 10th Omloop der Kempen
2013
 1st Topcompétition
 1st Stadsprijs Geraardsbergen
 3rd Overall Kreiz Breizh Elites
 3rd Memorial Van Coningsloo
 8th Omloop Het Nieuwsblad U23
 8th Grote Prijs Stad Geel
 9th Kattekoers
 9th Grand Prix Pino Cerami
2014
 1st  Points classification Kreiz Breizh Elites
 2nd Memorial Van Coningsloo
 7th Kernen Omloop Echt-Susteren
 9th Paris–Mantes-en-Yvelines
 9th GP Maurice Raes
2015
 1st Topcompétition
 Le Triptyque des Monts et Châteaux
1st  Mountains classification
1st  Sprints classification
 1st  Sprints classification Olympia's Tour
 5th Memorial Van Coningsloo
 5th De Kustpijl
 7th Overall Tour de Normandie
1st Stage 4
 8th Kattekoers
 9th Antwerpse Havenpijl
2016
 1st Stage 2 Circuit des Ardennes
 6th Rutland–Melton CiCLE Classic
 6th Omloop Mandel-Leie-Schelde
 8th Overall Tour de Normandie
 8th Antwerpse Havenpijl

References

External links

1990 births
Living people
Belgian male cyclists
People from Beveren
Cyclists from East Flanders